Mpi Anauel Ngamissengue (born 3 February 1996) is a Congolese professional boxer. As an amateur, he competed at the 2016 Summer Olympics in the men's middleweight event, in which he was eliminated by Ilyas Abbadi in the round of 32.

Professional boxing record

References

External links
 

1996 births
Living people
Republic of the Congo male boxers
Olympic boxers of the Republic of the Congo
Boxers at the 2016 Summer Olympics
Middleweight boxers
Sportspeople from Brazzaville